Dakhiliyah is a town located in Al-Hasakah Governorate, Syria.

References

Populated places in Al-Hasakah Governorate